Cheetah Vision is an American film production company founded in 2009 by Curtis '50 Cent' Jackson and Randall Emmett. The company produces low budget action thrillers for foreign film markets across the world.  The company's first film was Before I Self Destruct. In early 2011, 50 Cent landed a $200,000,000 deal for the company, which will fund a 10-picture deal. Grindstone/Lionsgate will distribute the films. Under the deal, the films will have a budget of around $20 million each.

Released films
Before I Self Destruct (November 16, 2009)
Caught in the Crossfire (July 20, 2010)
Gun (July 30, 2010)
Setup (September 20, 2011)
All Things Fall Apart (March 5, 2011) Film Festivals (December 3, 2011) Television
Freelancers (August 10, 2012)
Fire with Fire (November 6, 2012)
The Frozen Ground (July 19, 2013)
Tapia (June 15, 2013)
Empire State (September 3, 2013)

Upcoming films
The Dance (in-Production)

Music videos
"Crime Wave" (From Before I Self-Destruct)
"Stretch" (From Before I Self-Destruct)

References

50 Cent
Film production companies of the United States